Hannah Hurnard (1905–90) was a 20th-century Christian author, best known for her allegorical novel, Hinds' Feet on High Places.

Biography
Hurnard was born in 1905 in Colchester, England, to Quaker parents. She graduated from Ridgelands Bible College in 1926. In 1932 she became an independent missionary, moving to Haifa, Palestine. Her work in Palestine and later Israel lasted 50 years, although she would later maintain a home in England as well.

Eagles' Wings to the Higher Places has been said to support beliefs in pantheism, universalism, and gnosticism. Unveiled Glory tells of how she came to believe in Universal reconciliation.

"Mountains of Spices,” an allegorical Christian story, compares the nine spices or fragrant oils listed in the Song of Solomon, Chapter 4:13-14 to the nine fruits of the Spirit mentioned in Galatian 5: 22-23. Each spice or fragrant oil, represented by one of nine sacred mountains, parallels a fruit of the spirit. Led by the Great Shepherd, seekers journey into the mountains to learn about the precious spices and to receive the transformative Seed of Love in their hearts.

Selected bibliography
Hinds' Feet on High Places
Mountains of Spices published 1977 (Wheaton,Ill:Tyndale).
God's Transmitters
Hearing Heart
Fruitarianism: Compassionate Way To Transform Health
Garden of the Lord
Kingdom of Love
Wayfarer in the Land
Winged Life
Walking Among the Unseen
Eagles' Wings to the Higher Places
Watchmen on the Walls
Steps to the Kingdom
Thou Shalt Remember: Lessons of a Lifetime
The Unveiled Glory
The Way of Healing
The Inner Man
The Opened Understanding
The Heavenly Powers
The Mystery of Suffering
The Secrets of the Kingdom

References

English Christian universalists
Christian writers
1905 births
1990 deaths
20th-century Christian universalists
English Quakers
English Protestant missionaries
Quaker universalists
Protestant missionaries in Palestine (region)
British emigrants to Mandatory Palestine
20th-century Quakers